Century City  is an American science fiction-legal drama television series created by Ed Zuckerman, that aired on CBS from March 16, 2004 to January 20, 2005 before being cancelled due to low ratings. The series is set in Los Angeles in the year 2030.

Synopsis
The show follows the legal team of Crane, Constable, McNeil & Montero. At the helm are the firm's four partners, the founder and senior partner Hannah Crane; veteran attorney Marty Constable; the pleased-with-himself attorney Darwin McNeil; and the former Californian Congressman and newest partner, Tom Montero. The team is supplemented by the ambitious enthusiasm of two young associates, the self-critical and earnest Lukas Gold and the genetically enhanced first-year associate Lee May Bristol.

With the developments of cloning cells, genetic profiling, mind-altering antibiotics and even virtual rape, the attorneys of Crane, Constable, McNeil & Montero find themselves with an ongoing case-load of precedent-setting cases. In a time when lawyers can go before judges as holograms, the firm takes on such morally and ethically ambiguous cases as parents suing their doctor for withholding critical results of their unborn child's genetic mapping; defending a man accused of robbery for "stealing" back his identity from his ex-fiancée who has uploaded his presence and personality; protecting the rights of a woman who has been virtually raped through nanotechnology; and trying to enforce a contract for a rock star who refused to take a risky anti-aging treatment to help his band stay on top.

In the year 2030, the United States has 52 states and universal healthcare, Oprah Winfrey is the President of the United States (her Vice President is an openly gay, retired, one-armed, four-star U.S. armed forces general) and the Moon has been colonized. Genes for homosexuality and deviant behaviour have been discovered but genetic engineering allows said genes to be deactivated which as a result has impacted the artistic community greatly.

Cast

Main
 Nestor Carbonell as Tom Montero
 Viola Davis as Hannah Crane
 Héctor Elizondo as Martin Constable
 Eric Schaeffer as Darwin McNeil
 Ioan Gruffudd as Lukas Gold
 Kristin Lehman as Lee May Bristol

Recurring
 Shannon Walker Williams as Voxy/model

Episodes

Broadcast and release
Century City aired on the American CBS television network on Tuesday evenings and premiered on March 16, 2004. CBS ordered nine episodes, but broadcast only four before cancelling the series. Universal HD began broadcasting episodes on November 29, 2004, including previously unaired episodes.

In June 2009 Hulu made all nine episodes available for online viewing; however, they are cropped from their original widescreen presentations. They also bear an NBC logo, despite being a CBS program, due to Universal Studios owning the series.

Chronological order
The episodes were originally aired out of chronological order, mostly regarding the appearances of the character Voxxy and the other characters' knowledge of Lee May's genetic enhancements. The intended order is as follows, and was used by Hulu:

References

External links
 

2000s American crime drama television series
2004 American television series debuts
2004 American television series endings
2000s American legal television series
2000s American science fiction television series
CBS original programming
Television series set in 2030
Television series set in the 2030s
Television series by Universal Television
Television shows set in Los Angeles